The Treaty of Hué may refer to:

The Treaty of Hué (1863), which confirms the First Treaty of Saigon
The Treaty of Hue (1883), which cedes the regions of Annam and Tonkin to the French Empire
The Treaty of Hue (1884), which confirms the 1883 Treaty of Hué